Hit the Stage is a South Korean television program broadcast by Mnet in which K-pop idols team up with professional dance teams to compete in a dance survival contest. It premiered on July 27, 2016 and the first season concluded on September 28, 2016. It aired every Wednesday on Mnet and tvN at 11pm KST. The live competition is hosted by entertainers Jun Hyun-moo and Lee Soo-geun.

List of contestants 
Male contestants

Female contestants

Episodes

References

External links 
  

2016 South Korean television series debuts
South Korean reality television series
Mnet (TV channel) original programming
Dance competition television shows